Fort Smith Transit is the primary provider of mass transportation in  Sebastian County, Arkansas. Fix routes are operated Monday through Saturday on an hourly schedule with two timed-transfer points. One additional route operates Monday through Friday and has a timed-transfer point with one other route.

All routes except Rogers-Supercenter and Zero Street converge on the Downtown Transfer Station and depart at the top of the hour. The two Rogers routes and the Grand route converge at 20 minutes after the hour at the Grand & Rogers Transfer Point near the intersection of Kinkead Ave and N 58th St. The Zero Street route meets the Towson route at 15 minutes after the hour near the intersection of Jenny Lind Rd. and Zero St. Transfers are free at designated transfer points with a transfer issued from the driver.

Demand-response and paratransit service is also provided, but must be scheduled at least one day ahead of time.

Routes
Rogers - Downtown (DT)
Rogers - Supercenter (SC)
Midland
Grand
Towson
Zero Street (No Saturday service)

Service Hours
Fixed route: Monday through Saturday: 7:00AM–6:00PM (Last downtown transfer at 5:00PM)
Demand-response: Monday through Friday 5:30AM–7:00PM; Saturday 7:00AM–7:00PM

Fares
Fixed route: $1.25
Demand-response: $2.50 ($3.00 outside of normal fixed route service hours)

Holidays
Fixed route service is not provided on the following holidays. Demand-response service may be available if scheduled ahead of time.
New Years Day 
MLK Day
Good Friday
Memorial Day
July 4
Labor Day
Veteran's Day
Thanksgiving
Christmas

References
http://www.fortsmithar.gov/index.php/departments/transit

Fort Smith, Arkansas
Bus transportation in Arkansas
Transit agencies in Arkansas